Grevillea asparagoides is a species of flowering plant in the family Proteaceae and is endemic to the south-west of Western Australia. It is dense, prickly shrub with deeply divided leaves, the end lobes linear and sharply pointed, and pink to reddish flowers with red styles.

Description

Taxonomy
Grevillea asparagoides was first formally described in 1856 by botanist Carl Meissner in de Candolle's Prodromus Systematis Naturalis Regni Vegetabilis from specimens collected by James Drummond in the Swan River Colony. The specific epithet (asparagoides) is derived from a passing resemblance of the foliage to that of asparagus.

Distribution and habitat 
This grevillea geos in heathland and shrubland in scattered populations between Perenjori, Wongan Hills and Bindi Bindi in the Avon Wheatbelt biogeographic region.

Conservation status
Grevillea asparagoides is listed as "Priority Three" by the Government of Western Australia Department of Biodiversity, Conservation and Attractions, meaning that it is poorly known and known from only a few locations but is not under imminent threat.

Use in horticulture
This species requires a well-drained soil and full sun. Propagation is from cuttings; grafting on the east coast of Australia may be required to ensure greater reliability.

References

asparagoides
Endemic flora of Western Australia
Eudicots of Western Australia
Proteales of Australia
Taxa named by Carl Meissner
Plants described in 1856